CashPool is a cooperation of a multitude of smaller or virtual German private banks, in which they mutually waive ATM usage fees for their customers. It is not an interbank network but uses the pre-existing German ATM or Maestro/Cirrus networks. With more than 3200 ATMs, the cooperating banks' ATM networks form the smallest ATM group in Germany.

The cooperation was founded in 2000. Its primary competitor in Germany is Cash Group.

Background
Most banks in Germany, while connected through the German ATM network, charge ATM usage fees for customers of other banks.

In 1998, the six largest German private banks established Cash Group, mutually waiving these fees within the Group.

After the formation, other private banks tried to join Cash Group but were not accepted into the Group. Being smaller than the six large private banks, they operated fewer ATMs and thus would have unilaterally benefited from the use of the other bank's larger networks.

As a consequence, several of these smaller banks founded CashPool and also mutually waived ATM usage fees within the group. For comparison, the big banks CashGroup network has 9,000 ATMs, the co-operative banks (as far as being members of the Bankcard-Servicenetz) share 18,600 ATMs and the saving banks have list of 25,700 ATMs for their SparkassenCard.

The private banks (but not the savings banks and cooperative banks) had undertaken to charge a maximum of EUR 1.95 for payments to third-party customers from January 2011. In August 2015, Deutsche Bank, Postbank and Commerzbank terminated the voluntary commitment. The banks involved in Cashpool (listed below) currently have around 2,800 ATMs in Germany, of which around 160 locations are not publicly accessible because they are located on company premises or in a company building.  There is no nationwide supply or even distribution. So there are in Nuremberg, for example, there are around 20 ATMs (¾ of which are publicly accessible and also unevenly distributed within the city area), while the nearest ATM in the Sylt holiday region is only about 70 km away in Flensburg.

Members

Current members 
 Anton Hafner OHG, Bankgeschäft, Augsburg
 Bank für Sozialwirtschaft AG, Cologne
 Bankhaus Bauer, Stuttgart
 Bankhaus C. L. Seeliger, Wolfenbüttel
 Bankhaus E. Mayer AG, Freiburg im Breisgau
 Bankhaus Gebr. Martin AG, Göppingen
 Bankhaus J. Faisst OHG, Wolfach
 Bankhaus Ludwig Sperrer KG, Freising
 Bankhaus Max Flessa KG, Schweinfurt
 Bank Schilling & Co. AG, Hammelburg
 Bankverein Werther AG, Werther, North Rhine-Westphalia
 BBBank eG, Karlsruhe
 Citibank Privatkunden AG & Co. KGaA, Düsseldorf
 Degussa Bank GmbH, Frankfurt am Main
 Donner & Reuschel AG, Hamburg
 Fürstlich Castell’sche Bank, Credit-Casse AG, Würzburg
 Gabler-Saliter Bankgeschäft KG, Obergünzburg
 GE Money Bank GmbH, Hannover
 Joh. Berenberg, Gossler & Co. KG, Hamburg
 Merkur Bank KGaA, Munich
 National-Bank AG, Essen
 netbank AG, Hamburg
 Oldenburgische Landesbank AG, Oldenburg
 Pax-Bank eG, Cologne
 Santander Consumer Bank AG, Mönchengladbach
 SEB AG, Frankfurt am Main
 Sparda Banken-Gruppe
 Steyler Bank GmbH, Sankt Augustin
 Südwestbank AG, Stuttgart
 Targobank, Düsseldorf

Former Members 
 SchmidtBank KGaA, Hof
 Baden-Württembergische Bank AG (BW-Bank), Stuttgart
 Erste Rosenheimer Privatbank AG, Rosenheim
 Norisbank, Bonn
 CVW-Privatbank AG, Wilhermsdorf
 readybank ag, Berlin
 Wüstenrot Bank AG Pfandbriefbank, Ludwigsburg

References

External links 
 Official website (German)

Interbank networks
Financial services companies of Germany
Cash
2000 establishments in Germany
Financial services companies established in 2000